Into Thin Air is a 1997 book by Jon Krakauer.

Into Thin Air may also refer to:

 Into Thin Air: Death on Everest, a 1997 American TV movie based on Krakauer's book
 Into Thin Air (TV series), a 2005 Hong Kong drama series
 "Into Thin Air" (Alfred Hitchcock Presents), an episode of Alfred Hitchcock Presents
 "Into Thin Air", an episode of Astro Boy
 Into Thin Air, a novel by Caroline Leavitt
 Into Thin Air, a 2004 collected edition of the comics series The Pulse
 Into Thin Air, a mystery novel by Thomas Zigal
 Into Thin Air, a song by Trickside

See also 
 Thin Air (disambiguation)